Dancin' Days may refer to:
 Dancin' Days (2012 TV series), a Portuguese soap opera
 Dancin' Days (1978 TV series), a Brazilian telenovela

See also
 Dancing Days, a song by Led Zeppelin
 Dancing Days (album), an album by Chris Leslie